Will Brill is an American actor best known for his role as Scott Brown in The OA. Brill grew up in Menlo Park, California, and graduated from Gunn High School and the Carnegie Mellon School of Drama.

In addition to his television and film work, Brill has also appeared on Broadway, as part of the original cast of Act One, as Ed in the 2014 revival of You Can't Take It with You, and as Ali Hakim in the reimagined 75th-anniversary revival of Oklahoma!. He has also appeared in off-Broadway productions of Tribes and Our Town, both directed by David Cromer.

Filmography

Film

Television

References

External links

Living people
American male television actors
1986 births
Gunn High School alumni